"The World Is Yours" is a 1994 song by American rapper Nas. It was the fourth single from his debut album Illmatic, released a month after the album. It is considered by music critics as one of the greatest hip-hop songs ever recorded; About.com ranked it seventh greatest rap song of all time. It reached number 13 on the Hot Rap Singles chart in 1994. It contains a sample of Ahmad Jamal's 1970 song, "I Love Music".

The song (including the title) and its accompanying video pay homage to the film Scarface. The song also references drug dealer/crime boss Howard "Pappy" Mason. The song also mentions the serial killer of the Texarkana Moonlight Murders, which went, and still are, unsolved.

A remix of the song was produced by Q-Tip featuring similar but new lyrics; both it and the original were released by Columbia Records as singles, and promoted with music videos.

Sprite has put the title of this song on its cans and bottles in summer 2015 in part of their "Obey Your Verse" summer campaign which had rap lyrics on their cans.

Soundtrack appearances
The song was featured in the video games Tony Hawk's Underground and NBA 2K13. It can also be heard in a scene in the 2002 film Antwone Fisher, and appears on the soundtrack for the 2008 film The Wackness. The song is also played in the 2015 film Dope.

Other cultural references
"The World Is Yours" was mentioned by Nas in his later songs "Got Ur Self A..." and "Firm Biz".

Single track listing

A-Side
 "The World Is Yours" (4:51)
 "The World Is Yours" (Instrumental) (4:51)

B-Side
 "The World Is Yours" (Tip Mix) (4:29)
 "The World Is Yours" (Tip Mix Instrumental) (4:30)

Charts

Weekly charts

Certifications

References

1994 singles
Nas songs
Song recordings produced by Pete Rock
Songs written by Nas
Hardcore hip hop songs
1992 songs
Columbia Records singles
Black-and-white music videos
Songs written by Pete Rock
Jazz rap songs